Roses for Mama is the fifth album by country musician C. W. McCall (pseudonym for the singer and songwriter Bill Fries), released on Polydor Records in 1977 (see 1977 in music). The album saw McCall singing several songs that were written by others, as opposed to his previous albums, which were written entirely by himself (credited as Bill Fries) and Chip Davis. In fact, only three songs were written by the McCall and Davis; these are "I Don't Know (and I Don't Care)", "The Gallopin' Goose" and "Old Glory". "The Battle of New Orleans" is a cover version of Johnny Horton's popular 1959 song.

Track listing
 "Roses for Mama" (Johnny Wilson, Gene Dobbins, Wayne Sharpe) – 3:24
 "The Only Light" (Walt Meskell, Tim Martin) – 2:30
 "Livin' Within My Means" (Ron Agnew) – 2:59
 "Watch the Wildwood Flowers" (Agnew) – 2:50
 "Take My Duds to the Junkman" (Agnew) – 2:00
 "The Battle of New Orleans" (Jimmie Driftwood) – 2:50
 "I Don't Know (and I Don't Care)" (Bill Fries, Chip Davis) – 2:50
 "The Gallopin' Goose" (Fries, Davis) – 3:20
 "Night Hawk" (Tom McKeaon, Ron Peterson) – 2:45
 "Old Glory" (Fries, Davis) – 3:47

Personnel

 C. W. McCall – Vocals, Design
 Milt Bailey, Ruth Horn, Gary Morris, Sarah Westphalen – Vocals
 Chip Davis – Vocals, Drums, Percussion, Producer, Arranger
 Ron Agnew – Vocals, Electric Guitar, 6-String
 Ron Cooley – Electric Guitar, 6-String, 12-String
 Walt Meskell – Electric Guitar, 6-String, Banjo, Dobro
 Mark Gorat, Jack Moss – 6-String
 Jackson Berkey – Keyboards
 Eric Hansen – Bass, Harmonica
 Dorothy Brown, Hugh Brown, Miriam Dufflemeyer, Lucinda Gladics, James Hammond, Joe Landes, Beth McCollum, Merton Shatzkin, Alex Sokol – Strings

Additional personnel

 Don Sears – Producer, Engineer, Design
 John Boyd, Ron Ubel, Jim Wheeler – Engineers
 John Kircher – Photography
 Dudycha, Schirck and Associates, Inc. – Art Direction and Production

Charts

Album – Billboard (North America)

Singles – Billboard (North America)

External links
 NarrowGauge.org album information for Roses for Mama

Roses for Mama
Roses for Mama
Roses for Mama